Ju Yeong-sam (born 25 March 1966) is a South Korean gymnast. He competed at the 1984 Summer Olympics and the 1988 Summer Olympics.

References

1966 births
Living people
South Korean male artistic gymnasts
Olympic gymnasts of South Korea
Gymnasts at the 1984 Summer Olympics
Gymnasts at the 1988 Summer Olympics
Place of birth missing (living people)
Asian Games medalists in gymnastics
Gymnasts at the 1986 Asian Games
Asian Games silver medalists for South Korea
Asian Games bronze medalists for South Korea
Medalists at the 1986 Asian Games
20th-century South Korean people